Selako may refer to:
 Selako language, a dialect of Kendayan language spoken in Borneo
 Selako people, an ethnic of the Dayak people group from Borneo